The Scots Independent is a monthly Scottish political newspaper that is in favour of Scottish independence.  It was formed in 1926 with William Gillies as editor, by the Scots National League (SNL) and switched its allegiance to the National Party of Scotland (NPS) when the SNL joined with them in 1928.

When the NPS merged with the Scottish Party in 1934 to form the Scottish National Party (SNP) they switched to supporting them.  The paper is still today largely pro-SNP.

Editors of the paper have included Arthur Donaldson, Robert McIntyre, Tom H Gibson, John L. Kinloch, Alastair Macdonald, Michael Grieve, Albert D. Mackie, David Murison, Douglas Stewart, Alwyn James, Colin Bell, W. Kenneth Fee and James and Jennifer Taggart.

See also

List of newspapers in Scotland
The National

References

External links
The Scots Independent website

Newspapers published in Scotland
Scottish independence
Scottish National Party
Stirling (council area)
Newspapers with Scottish Gaelic content
Publications established in 1926
1926 establishments in Scotland